Bruce Landon (born October 5, 1949) is a Canadian former professional ice hockey hockey executive and goaltender who was the longtime part-owner, president and general manager of the Springfield Falcons of the American Hockey League.

Playing career
Following a successful junior career with the Peterborough Petes of the Ontario Hockey League in which he finished second in the league in goals against average in his final season, Landon was selected in the fourth round of the 1969 amateur draft by the Los Angeles Kings of the National Hockey League.  He played three seasons for their minor-league affiliate Springfield Kings, finishing ninth in the league in 1970 and leading the league to the Calder Cup finals, and backing up future Hockey Hall of Famer Billy Smith as the Kings won the AHL's Calder Cup championship in 1971.  

In 1973, Landon signed with the upstart World Hockey Association's New England Whalers and was the team's backup goaltender for five seasons.  His best season was 1976, where despite a losing record provoked by the Whalers' anemic offense, he had a goals against average of 3.47, good for 9th place in the high scoring WHA.

He had a second stint with Springfield at the start of the 1977–78 AHL season, but suffered a career-ending knee injury in practice and retired at age 28.

Landon finished his WHA career with 50 wins, 50 losses and 9 ties in 122 games, recording two shutouts and a 3.46 goals against average.

Hockey executive
After his retirement, Landon was hired by the Springfield Indians as an executive and broadcaster, and won the AHL's Ken McKenzie Award as the individual who best promoted his team in 1980, the James C. Hendy Memorial Award in 1989 as the league's top executive, and the Thomas Ebright Award for outstanding contributions to the league in 2002. In 1982, Landon became the general manager of the Springfield AHL team, and remained in that position for the remainder of the Indians' existence, leading the franchise to its final two Calder Cup championships in 1990 and 1991.

When the Indians were sold to out-of-town interests in 1994 and moved to Worcester, Massachusetts, Landon put together an investment group to secure an expansion franchise from the AHL, the Springfield Falcons.  The league, which is based in Springfield, was keen to maintain a presence in a city that has been hosted a team in the AHL and its predecessors for all but seven years since 1926.  Landon was the president and general manager of the Falcons until 2014.

On November 3, 2007, the American Hockey League, in recognition of his years of service to hockey, held a "Bruce Landon Night" in Springfield, Massachusetts, at the MassMutual Center.

On February 4, 2014, Landon ended an era, stepping down as president, general manager and co-owner of the Springfield Falcons, and was named director of hockey operations by the team until the spring of 2016, when he retired shortly before the team was relocated to Tucson, Arizona.  He was subsequently named a senior consultant by its successor franchise, the Springfield Thunderbirds, until retiring at the end of the 2016–17 AHL season. Landon was honored by the city of Springfield by the renaming of a downtown street "Bruce Landon Way", and was inducted by the AHL into the AHL Hall of Fame in 2016.

His autobiography, The Puck Stops Here: My (Not So) Minor League Life, was published in 2019.

References

External links
 
 Springfield Falcons home page

1949 births
Living people
Canadian ice hockey goaltenders
Sportspeople from London, Ontario
New England Whalers players
Peterborough Petes (ice hockey) players
Springfield Indians players
Ice hockey people from Ontario
Los Angeles Kings draft picks